Irene Bedard (born July 22, 1967) is an American actress, who has played mostly lead Native American roles in a variety of films. She is perhaps best known for the role of Suzy Song in the 1998 film Smoke Signals, an adaptation of a Sherman Alexie collection of short stories, as well as for providing the speaking voice for the titular character in the 1995 animated film Pocahontas. Bedard reprised her role as Pocahontas in the film's direct-to-video follow-up, Pocahontas II: Journey to a New World (1998) and for a cameo in Ralph Breaks the Internet (2018).

Early life
Bedard was born in Anchorage, Alaska and is of Iñupiat and French Canadian/Cree (Métis) heritage and an enrolled member of the Native Village of Koyuk in Alaska. Bedard graduated from Dimond High School in Anchorage, Alaska in 1985. Bedard attended The University of the Arts in Philadelphia, Pennsylvania where she studied musical theater.

Career
In 1994, Bedard appeared in her first role as Mary Crow Dog in the television production of Lakota Woman: Siege at Wounded Knee, which depicted the 1970s standoff between the US government and citizens of several Native nations, including many of the Pine Ridge Reservation, at Wounded Knee, South Dakota. For this role, she was nominated for a Golden Globe Award for Best Actress in a Miniseries or Television Film. She is probably best known as the voice of the eponymous heroine in the 1995 Disney animated film Pocahontas, the direct-to-video 1998 sequel Pocahontas II: Journey to a New World and in the 2018 film Ralph Breaks the Internet. She appeared in a different take of the story in Terence Malick's 2005 film The New World, as Pocahontas's mother, Nonoma Winanuske Matatiske.

In 1995, Bedard was chosen as one of People magazine's "50 Most Beautiful People".

In 2001, Irene Bedard hosted the Ninth Annual First Americans in the Arts (FAITA) Awards from the Beverly Hilton Hotel. In 2002, at the Tenth Annual FAITA Awards, Bedard won Outstanding Guest Performance by an Actress in a TV Drama Series for The Agency.

In 2005, she was cast in the television mini-series Into the West as Margaret "Light Shines" Wheeler.  Bedard has been very active in environmental groups to protect sacred lands. In 1997, she co-hosted with Floyd Westerman a benefit for the Dine' People of Big Mountain at The Loft Theatre, in Pasadena. In 2015, she appeared in Chloé Zhao's debut feature film, Songs My Brothers Taught Me. In 2016, Bedard announced an agreement with the Catawba Nation of South Carolina to join in a production agreement. In 2017, she appeared as a recurring character in the TV series The Mist. Bedard made an appearance in the music video for Jay-Z's 2017 song "Family Feud".

In 2020, Bedard played a recurring character in seasons one and two of the drama series FBI: Most Wanted. She then was a starring cast member in the Paramount+ miniseries The Stand, as Ray Brentner, a gender-swapped version of Ralph Brentner from the 1994 adaptation. In 2022, she was cast as Yagoda in the upcoming Netflix series Avatar: The Last Airbender and as Sylvie Nanmac in Alaska Daily, the mother of a missing indigenous woman.

Personal life 
In 1993, Bedard married musician Deni Wilson.  Between her films, the pair toured for several years with other musicians in a band called "ID," which came from the initials of their first names, Irene and Deni. In 2012, the couple divorced following Bedard's allegations of Wilson abusing Bedard.

In November 2020, Bedard was arrested twice in three days. The first arrest was for alleged domestic violence, assault, disorderly conduct, resisting arrest, and criminal damaging; the second was for alleged disorderly conduct.

On August 20, 2022, she was again arrested for drunken disorderly conduct after she was heard loudly arguing
with another woman in the street with no regard of safety in Xenia, Ohio. Bedard claims she was locked out of her studio and had no alcohol in her system, but police detected alcohol on her breath. The incident had begun as a welfare check on the other woman, who was reported as being passed out in the bushes, but she was gone when authorities arrived, leaving Bedard at the scene.

Filmography

Film

Television

Music video

Video games

Awards and nominations

References

External links
Irene Bedard Biography at who2.com

1967 births
20th-century American actresses
20th-century Native Americans
21st-century American actresses
21st-century Native Americans
Actresses from Anchorage, Alaska
American film actresses
American people of French-Canadian descent
American people of Métis descent
American television actresses
American voice actresses
Cree people
Inuit actresses
Inupiat people
Living people
Native American actresses
University of the Arts (Philadelphia) alumni
20th-century Native American women
21st-century Native American women